Vice Squad is a 1982 American action crime thriller film directed by Gary Sherman and starring Wings Hauser, Season Hubley, and Gary Swanson. The original music score was composed by Joe Renzetti and Keith Rubinstein. Wings Hauser sang the vocal track for the film's opening and closing theme song, "Neon Slime".

Plot
A down-on-her-luck Los Angeles businesswoman-turned-prostitute, known only by her street name Princess, walks the Sunset Boulevard to support herself and her young daughter Lisa. As she prepares Lisa for a trip to see her grandmother in San Diego, Princess receives a distressed telephone call from her friend and coworker, Ginger Grady, who is hiding in a motel from her abusive pimp Ramrod, a misogynistic psychopath. Shortly thereafter, Ramrod tracks Ginger down and coaxes her to open the door under the guise of an apology. As soon as she does, however, he violently ties her to the bed and beats and rapes her with a pimp stick.

Across town, the work routine of undercover LAPD vice squad sergeant Tom Walsh and trainee officer Edwards is disrupted by a call to the hospital. Tom, who already knows Ramrod at least by reputation, watches Ginger die from her injuries before he can convince her to identify her attacker. Tom promises to avenge her death by bringing Ramrod to justice. He brings Princess down to the hospital morgue to discuss her pending cocaine possession and warns that, even though she does not use drugs, an unsympathetic judge will incarcerate her and remove custody of Lisa. He offers her a pardon in exchange for her help catching a violent criminal. Princess initially refuses out of fear upon hearing who the criminal is, but Tom changes her mind by showing her Ginger's corpse. 

Princess wears a wire while attracting Ramrod's attention in a nightclub. He invites her back to his apartment, and is promptly arrested by Tom's squad once he reveals incriminating information. Ramrod is surprised but unrepentant when he learns he has killed Ginger, and furiously resists arrest once he realizes the setup. The scuffle ends when Tom pushes a gun against his head, at which point Ramrod vows to kill Princess. 

On the drive to the station, Ramrod manages to disable officers Mendez and Kolowski and cause an accident. He has his handcuffs removed, borrows a car from acquaintance Roscoe, and purchases a gun from gay leather club owner Fast Eddie who also identifies Joe Dorsey as Princess' former pimp.

The squad hits the streets looking to find Ramrod and Princess before the two of them cross paths. Williams and her patrol partner interrogate Roscoe until they learn which car Ramrod is currently driving. Meanwhile, Princess meets some of her colleagues at a sleazy dive bar where they discuss their customers' kinks. Princess is then propositioned by a patron but remains aloof during sex, and the disgruntled client forcibly takes his money back.

After brutally interrogating and castrating Dorsey, Ramrod heads to Princess' motel. Before he arrives, however, she is picked up by a wealthy client's chauffeur on recommendation of her friend Coco. The vice squad follow Ramrod's trail but the motel manager, who had been beaten by Ramrod moments earlier, is uncooperative when Tom interrogates her. Ramrod kidnaps Coco and tortures her until she reveals the chauffer took Princess to Beverly Hills.

Inside the Beverly Hills house, Princess is instructed to dress as a bride and descend to the parlor, where the elderly client lays motionless in a casket. She accidentally botches the encounter by screaming when he unexpectedly jumps awake. Police officers find the injured Coco beside a trash heap and unknowingly drive past Ramrod who has just stolen a newspaper delivery truck after murdering its driver, and is pursuing Princess' taxi. Her friends attempt to warn her, but Ramrod then chases after them, hitting one of the women in the process. He pulls Princess into his truck and takes her to an abandoned warehouse.

The police arrive as he begins to torture her, and Ramrod jumps out the window, shooting multiple officers and stealing a car. Tom relentlessly pursues him across town, finally cornering him in an alleyway and shooting him dead. Just after daybreak, Tom emerges from the warehouse with a gunshot wound in his arm. While being lifted into an ambulance, Princess tells him that he will "never be able to change the streets", and he walks away as the sun rises over the city.

Cast

 Season Hubley as Princess
 Gary Swanson as Tom Walsh
 Wings Hauser as Ramrod
 Pepe Serna as Pete Mendez
 Beverly Todd as Louise Williams
 Joseph DiGiroloma as Kowalski
 Maurice Emanuel as Detective Edwards
 Wayne Hackett as Christian Sorenson
 Nina Blackwood as Ginger
 Sudana Bobatoon as Dixie
 Lydia Lei as Coco
 Kelly Piper as Blue Chip
 Kristoffer Anders as Sergeant Brooks
 Joseph Baroncini as Ted
 Fred Berry as Sugar Pimp Dorsey
 Tom Brent as Happy Harve
 Grand L. Bush as Black Pimp
 Marilyn Coleman as Beatrice Adams
 Michael Ensign as Chauffeur
 Stacy Everly as Teenage Junkie
 Cliff Frazier as Mace
 Lyla Graham as Mrs. Cruikshank
 Vincent J. Isaac as Silky
 Cyndi James Gossett as Black Prostitute (as Cyndi James-Reese)
 Robert Miano as Duty Sergeant
 Stack Pierce as Roscoe
 Barbara Pilavin as Derelict Woman
 Donald Rawley as Gregory - The Swish
 Cheryl Smith as White Prostitute
 Hugo Stanger as Old Man at Mansion
 Nicole Volkoff as Lisa
 Richard Wetzel as Fast Eddie
 Ark Wong as Mr. Wong
 Harry Hart-Browne as Trixie (uncredited)

References

External links

1982 films
1982 action thriller films
1982 crime drama films
American police detective films
American independent films
Embassy Pictures films
Films directed by Gary Sherman
Films shot in Los Angeles
Films scored by Joe Renzetti
1982 independent films
1980s English-language films
1980s American films